Hendrik Jules Joseph "Rik" Daems (born 18 August 1959) is a Belgian painter, wine trader and politician who served as the president of the Parliamentary Assembly of the Council of Europe from 2020 to 2022, a 70-year-old body bringing together parliamentarians from 47 nations of the Council of Europe. He is a former member of the Belgian Chamber of Representatives for the Flemish Liberals and Democrats (VLD) and member of the city council of Leuven.

Early life and education
Rik Daems' father, was a senator and Secretary of State for the Party for Freedom and Progress (PVV). Rik Daems studied Latin and mathematics at the Keerbergen high school (1977). Afterwards he studied at the Solvay Business School of the Vrije Universiteit Brussel.

Political career
In addition to his role in national politics, Daems has been a member of the Belgian delegation to the Parliamentary Assembly of the Council of Europe since 2007, and led the Alliance of Liberals and Democrats for Europe – the third largest of the assembly's five political groups –- from 2017 until his election as president. In 2019, he was the assembly's rapporteur on the activities of the European Bank for Reconstruction and Development (EBRD) as well as on minimum standards for electoral systems.

Recognition 
 2014 : Knight Grand Cross in the Order of Leopold II.

References

External links

 "PROFILE: Rik Dames" at European Voice
 Profile on the website of the Parliamentary Assembly of the Council of Europe

1959 births
Living people
People from Aarschot
Open Vlaamse Liberalen en Democraten politicians
Members of the Belgian Federal Parliament
Vrije Universiteit Brussel alumni
Recipients of the Grand Cross of the Order of Leopold II
21st-century Belgian politicians